This is a list of coats of arms of Hamburg, Germany, and its districts and boroughs (de)

Boroughs (including historical)

Altona

Harburg

Other

Districts

See also 
 Coat of arms of Hamburg
 Flag of Hamburg

References

External links 
 Index of Hamburg Flags via Flags of the World
 Harburg (City) (German)
 Harburg-Wilhelmsburg via Heraldry wiki
 Harburg modern via Heraldry wiki
 Old Coat of Arms of Altona (City) via Heraldry wiki
 Bergedorf via Heraldry wiki
 Coat of Arms of Bergedorf (German)
 Wandsbeck via Heraldry wiki

Hamburg
History of Hamburg
Heraldry